Individualist feminism is a libertarian feminist tradition that emphasizes individualism, personal autonomy, choice, consent, freedom from state-sanctioned discrimination against women, and equality under the law. It also opposes what is considered political or gender feminism.

Overview 

Individualist feminists attempt to change legal systems to eliminate sex and gender privileges, and to ensure that individuals have equal rights, including an equal claim under the law to their own persons and property, regardless of their gender, sex, or sexual orientation. Individualist feminism encourages women to take full responsibility for their own lives and opposes any government interference into the choices adults make with their own bodies. Individualist or libertarian feminism is sometimes grouped as one of many branches of liberal feminism, but tends to diverge significantly from mainstream liberal feminism in the 21st Century.

The Association of Libertarian Feminists (ALF), founded by Tonie Nathan in 1973, is a individualist feminist organization in the U.S. "Libertarian feminists resent and reject all legislation which attempts to provide us with special treatment by the law," said the group's initial mission statement. "We also resent and reject legislation which attempts to 'equalize' our social or economic position. [...] However, recognizing that bigotry and unjust legal discrimination do exist presently, we support the efforts of all concerned individuals to change this situation by non-coercive means." ALF takes a strong anti-government and pro-choice stand.

Other libertarian feminist organizations include the Ladies of Liberty Alliance, Feminists for Liberty, and the defunct Mother's Institute, which included Mothers for Liberty (meet-up groups). "If feminism is 'the radical notion that women are people,' libertarian feminism is the even more radical notion that women (and men) are individuals and should be treated as such," states the Feminists for Liberty website.

Introduction 

Early organized feminism in the United States was fundamentally “a classical liberal women’s movement,” stated author Joan Kennedy Taylor in the essay “Feminism, Classical Liberalism, and the Future.” First-wave feminists focused on "universal suffrage" - voting rights for women and for Americans of color - and the abolition of slavery, along with property rights for women and other forms of equal rights. Individualist feminism fell out of vogue in the U.S. and the U.K. as the Progressive, Labor, and Socialist movements began to hold more sway over politics during the Victorian era and in the early 20th century.

Individualist feminism was revived in the radical anti-authoritarianism and individualist spirit of the second-wave feminists of the mid-20th Century. “[T]he political issues that gained wide adherence were the reproductive rights to birth control and abortion, and the Equal Rights Amendment, which (at least in its initial support) was a classical liberal restraint on government,” wrote Taylor in her 1992 book Reclaiming the Mainstream: Individualist Feminism Reconsidered.

Labels like individualist feminism, libertarian feminism, and classical liberal feminism were explicitly embraced by late 20th Century writers and activists such as Taylor, Presley, Tonie Nathan (the Libertarian Party's first Vice Presidential nominee, in 1972), and Wendy McElroy. Modern libertarian feminism is a continuation of ideas and work developed by these women and their contemporaries (many of whom are still active today), including Nadine Strossen and Camille Paglia, as well as of the ideas of classical liberal and anarchist writers throughout history.

Mary Wollstonecraft, Olympe de Gouges, Voltairine de Cleyre, Soujourner Truth, John Stuart Mill, Ida Bell Wells-Barnett, Lucy Stone, Frederick Douglass, and Suzanne Clara La Follette are a few of the historical writers and activists who have influenced libertarian feminism.

One central theme of individualist feminism revolves around the Free Love Movement, which indicates that a woman's sexual choices should be made by her and her alone, rather than by government regulations. Wendy McElroy and Christina Hoff Sommers define individualist feminism in opposition to what they call political or gender feminism. It conforms to the theory of natural law and believes in laws that protect both the rights of men and women equally.

Individualist feminists do not believe equality is strictly a legal issue; however, they believe that equality under the law is the only proper standard for government. Individual feminists argue that government should not move to "equal the playing field" or correct historic discrimination by prioritizing the needs of women over men, nor should it strive to intervene to create equality in personal relationships, private economic arrangements, entertainment and media representation, or the general sociocultural realm.

History in the United States

Abolition movement 
The origin of feminism is linked to the abolition movement that occurred in the 1830s. The abolition movement was a social movement that aimed to eradicate the practice of slavery in the United States by insisting that every man was born to self-govern himself. The issue had attracted the participation of women, ranging from the upper class to the working class due to the similarities that they perceived between their oppression as women and the oppression of slaves.

Thus, through abolition, women of 19th century found a way to express their ideas and dissatisfaction with women's rights and directly triggered a heated debate among society. Although a famous figure such as William Lloyd Garrison, a libertarian, supported women's rights, he advised women's rights activists such as Angelina Grimke and several others to stop mixing the issue of women's rights into their lecture on anti-slavery.

However, the Grimke sister's efforts to advocate for women's rights are not confined to just one method. Sarah Grimke’s Letters on the Equality of the Sexes and the Condition of Woman in 1837 addressed the roles of women in several aspects within society.

On February 21, 1838, Angelina Grimke became the first woman to deliver a speech in front of the Massachusetts Legislature. She delivered a speech that contained a mixture of two important issues, the antislavery petitions and women’s status in society.

Pre-Civil War feminism 
The women's suffrage supporters began to write, lecture, march and campaign at the beginning of mid-19th century. The earliest Women's Rights Convention or Seneca Falls Convention was held in July 1848 by two organizers, Elizabeth Cady Stanton and Lucretia Mott. In this convention, they produced a list of demands, the ‘Declaration of Sentiments’ insisting on giving women more opportunities in education and employment as well as gaining the rights to control their income and property.

During the Civil War 
The Civil War began in 1861 and it lasted until 1865. During the Civil War, women activists focused on supporting the abolition of slaves. Susan B. Anthony and Elizabeth Cady Stanton, formed a group known as the Women's Loyal National League in 1863, to press for an end to slavery and demanded the newly freed slaves gain full citizenship rights.

Two important figures who contributed greatly to the abolition movement were Harriet Tubman and Sojourner Truth. Harriet Tubman was an African American woman who used her knowledge and abilities to be a spy for the Union Army during the Civil War. Sojourner Truth passionately lectured about the rights of women and the rights of African Americans.

Post-Civil War 
After the Civil War, feminists focused on issues that aimed for the blacks' freedom by focusing on three specific Amendments to the constitution. The Thirteenth Amendment was ratified by the states on December 6, 1865, to abolish slavery. The Fourteenth Amendment was ratified on July 9, 1868, confirming the nationality of those who were born and naturalized in the United States, including formerly enslaved people as citizens of America.

In 1870, the 15th Amendment of the Constitution was ratified, allowing black men to have the right to vote, which caused quite a stir among woman suffragists. In May 1869, Elizabeth Cady Stanton along with Susan B. Anthony created The National Woman Suffrage Association (NWSA). This organization was composed of suffragists who were against the 15th Amendment because women were not included. To gain their right to vote, the NWSA applied a confrontational strategy by sending the Senate and House Representative a voting rights petition that aimed for the federal woman suffrage amendment and requested for the opportunity to speak on the Congress.

In the same year, 1869, Lucy Stone, Julia Ward Howe, and Thomas Wentworth Higginson established the American Woman Suffrage Association (AWSA). Opposite to NWSA, they supported the 15th amendment and opposed the methods used by NWSA. The AWSA chose to start at local and state levels to gain access for women to vote, hoping that they will slowly receive support to act on the national level.

Despite that, in 1890, both organizations united into a new organization, the National American Woman Suffrage Association (NAWSA). A year before the adoption of the 19th amendment, the NAWSA organization merged with the National Council of Women Voters that was established by Emma Smith DeVoe in 1909, forming a new league, the League of Women Voters.

Free Love movement 
Individualist feminism focused on another variety of social issues instead of pursuing the issue of women's suffrage. Their participation is conveyed through a social movement known as the Free Love movement. It is a movement that aimed to separate government interference from matters such as marriage and birth control. They believe that such issues were related to those involved only.

In the 19th century, the usage of contraception became a serious issue among Americans.  Use of contraception was considered ‘obscene’ and many citizens condemned this practice. However, social reformers were concerned about abortions by low-income women, particularly prostitutes, and the difficulty of childbirth. However, Comstock Law blocked discussions on birth control. As for marriage institutions, a wife's earning, property and her person was under the control of her husband. She had to oblige his demand in every aspect, including being his bedmate, which sometimes could result in a violent outcome.

Notable individualist feminists

Joan Kennedy Taylor 
Joan Kennedy Taylor was an American author, activist, and pundit. She started her career in publishing and was considered apolitical for the first thirty years of her life. Taylor converted to libertarianism with the help of Ayn Rand. She would go on to become active in the Libertarian Party as well as groups like the Association of Libertarian Feminists and Feminists for Free Expression (which Taylor co‐founded). She is the author of Reclaiming the Mainstream: Individualist Feminism Rediscovered and What to Do When You Don't Want to Call the Cops: A Non-Adversarial Approach to Sexual Harassment (New York University Press, 1999).

Wendy McElroy 
Wendy McElroy is a Canadian author and activist who emphasizes individualism, particularly from the state, from the patriarchy, and from any kind of hierarchy. She is the editor of the website ifeminists.net and of the books Individualist Feminism of the Nineteenth Century: Collected Writings and Biographical Profiles and Freedom, Feminism, and the State (2017). She is also the author of Sexual Correctness: The Gender-Feminist Attack on Women (1996), XXX: A Woman's Right to Pornography Paperback (1997), The Reasonable Woman: A Guide to Intellectual Survival (1998), and Queen Silver: The Godless Girl (1999).

McElroy proposed a controversial statement about each human being's freedom of the choice made for their own body. She battled out this issue in her book Sexual Correctness: The Gender-Feminist Attack on Women. Firstly, she stands on the ideology that women, who are also human, should be given the same right of self-ownership for their own body as men are given. She argues strongly that to cross the jurisdiction of one's own body is comparable to slavery. She firmly stated that this ideology was needed for the embodiment of self-individual rights and greater freedom for women. McElroy also emphasized that the mythology of rape should ultimately be changed. This is because the term and action of rape can be used as a weapon politically. In a sense, since rape (or accusations thereof) bestows a bad reputation, it may be used as a hidden trump card to hold and subdue women in a patriarchal society. Since women are almost always the victim of rape, this also implies that women are weak, lower, and cannot gain control of their self-ownership. Thus McElroy stresses these issues strongly, recommending a change in the radical view on rape in order to help the victim from being placed under the spotlight or labeled as “damaged goods.” Other than the issue of rape, she also profoundly defended women's participation and interest in pornography from a feminist perspective. In short, from a liberal point of view she stands firm in her belief that pornography benefits women, as it provides freedom for a woman's own body, rights, and expression.

Camille Paglia 
Camille Anna Paglia is an American feminist academic known for her social critique of American feminism. Paglia had published several literary works which link to American Feminism. Paglia's opinion elaborated in her books led to tensions with the current feminist establishment. Paglia came across as "anti-feminist feminist" to certain.

Paglia had written a book entitled “Free Women, Free Men: Sex, Gender, Feminism” in 2017 which manifested her unconventional ideology on feminism. Paglia's considered most controversial arguments are compiled and published in the book with the central idea of “enlightened feminism”. The book is an essay collection comprising her 25 years stances on date rape, abortion, free speech, sex and more. Concerning the matter of rape culture, Paglia emphasized on personal responsibility that women are obligated to raise. Women should explore initiatives to acquire knowledge on the risk factors leading to date rape. Paglia asserted that the obtained knowledge could be implemented in females’ campus lives to reduce the risk of rape. It is a simple action that could be achieved to lower the risk of date rape. Hence, this indicates women should take their own precaution to date rape. This book refuses to ‘bow’ to the conservative ideology of “playing the victim” in a date rape situation. The consistent opinion from Paglia on date rape discovered in an interview reveals the irresponsibility of females who let themselves get “dead drunk”. Although other feminists labelled the situation as “blaming the victim”, Paglia compels women to never portray themselves as vulnerable nor gullible to others. Such a situation would indisputably allow males to deftly take advantage and engage with them.

Although the opinion of Paglia frequently opposes other feminist opinions, the view of Naomi Wolf on abortion is astonishingly parallel to hers. They are determined that induced abortion is unethical to be committed. Paglia bluntly voiced that abortion is regarded as murder. She unveils her view which defines abortion as “the extermination of the powerless by the powerful” traced in an interview in 2006. According to the Centers for Disease Control and Prevention (CDC), the abortion rate among women aged 15 to 44 years old in 2018 is 11.3 abortions per 1,000 women worldwide. It is reported that the abortion ratio is 189 abortions per 1000 live births in the same year. However, Paglia disclosed to be a pro-choice and firmly supports to unrestricted access of abortion in 2016. She believed women with a career are subject to their own body. Paglia stated in her book “Free Women, Free Men: Sex, Gender, Feminism” that the ruling of Supreme Court's Roe v. Wade which legalized abortion in all the 50 states became the first landmark to feminism in the 1970s. Moreover, Paglia insists in “Vamps & Tramps: New Essays” that bearing an unwanted infant is socially and professionally “inconvenient” or “onerous”. She deeply feels that no control could be asserted over a woman's own body.

Rene Denfeld 
Rene Denfeld was born in 1967. She is a journalist, award-winning author and a licensed private investigator and currently lives in Portland, Oregon. In Denfeld's popular feminist book The New Victorians (1995), she raised her deep view towards the contemporary feminist movement which she believed to be deviated as young women felt alienated from this movement itself. Other than that, since in the 1970s, she felt the progress of the movement totally contradicted its own foundations. Denfeld categorized the movement as a group that mainly discussed about male bashing or hatred towards men rather than glorifying women's rights.

Libertarian feminist organizations

Ladies of Liberty Alliance (LOLA) 
The Ladies of Liberty Alliance (also known as LOLA) is an organization with a mission to educate and empower female leaders within the liberty movement. Ladies of Liberty Alliance is a network of independent, libertarian women leaders who, through their careers and personal endeavors, are dedicated to spreading the ideas of individual liberty and free markets. The participation of LOLA is open to any female who is wishing to explore the idea of libertarian. In addition, participation is free and self-defined.

This organization was established in 2009 as a non-profit, non-political and educational organization to address the lack of women in the liberty movement. Nena Bartlett Whitfield is the president of Ladies of Liberty Alliance. She used to be active as a founding member and former Treasurer of the DC Liberty Toastmasters, Chair of the Republican Liberty Caucus of DC, and the former vice president and Treasurer of the Norwich Alumni DC Chapter. In 2013, Nena left Capitol Hill to work as full-time Executive Director at Ladies of Liberty Alliance.

LOLA will encourage the female leaders to stay engaged with libertarian philosophy, promote freedom to new people, and boost up the organization's work through leadership training. The libertarian women leaders will engage actively in public discourse, showing empathy to those harmed by the government, and invite new audiences to the political and societal changes.

Active leaders of LOLA will be invited to participate in the LOLA Leadership Retreat. LOLA provides skills-based training which is offered at Washington, DC and cities with its social chapters in order to help women reach individual and professional goals plus, becoming the strong speakers of libertarian ideas.

Social groups of LOLA located in cities throughout the U.S. where women who share the same idea come together to share the passion of liberty, establish a strong community through relationship building and empower one another to be active members of the liberty movement.

Location of social groups in America 
 North America
 Charlotte, North Carolina
 Billings, Montana
 Virginia Beach, Virginia
 Phoenix, Arizona
 Dallas, Texas
 Philadelphia, Pennsylvania
 Seattle/Tacoma
 Houston, Texas
 Austin, Texas
 Sacramento, California
 Denver, Colorado
 Chicago, Illinois
 Omaha, Nebraska
 Atlanta, Georgia
 New York, New York
 Los Angeles, California
 Washington, D.C.
 Kansas City, Kansas
 South America
 Honduras
 Mendoza, Argentina
 Buenos Aires, Argentina
 Quito, Ecuador
 Cali, Colombia
 Montevideo, Uruguay
 Bogota, Colombia
 Mexico City, Mexico
 Santiago, Chile
 Santiago del Estero, Argentina

Mothers Institute 
The Mothers Institute was a non-profit educational and networking organization supporting stay-at-home mothering, homeschooling, civics in the classroom, and an effective networking system for mothers and freedom of choice in health and happiness. It is now defunct.

Feminists for Liberty 
Feminists for Liberty (F4L) is a nonprofit libertarian feminist group founded in 2016. It was launched by millennial libertarians Kat Murti and Elizabeth Nolan Brown to promote the values of libertarian feminism, publicize libertarian feminist voices, bring together libertarian feminists and those interested in the concept, advocate for classical liberal positions on public policy, and help revive the libertarian feminist movement for the 21st Century. Feminists for Liberty's taglines are "anti-sexism & anti-statism, pro-markets & pro-choice" and "consent in all things."

According to the Feminists for Liberty website, its mission includes opposing "government-sanctioned sexism in all its forms" and pushing "for systems in which sex and gender are irrelevant to how one is treated under the law." The group also aims to "to amplify the voices of freedom-minded feminists," inject "a libertarian feminist perspective into contemporary political conversations and media," and drive "more diverse and open liberty-movement discourse on issues surrounding sex, gender, sexuality, reproductive decisions, family issues, and equal rights."

Feminists for Liberty believes that "true feminism and libertarianism are highly compatible, as both are centered on the inherent worth and power of the individual." They are opposed to collectivism and argue that sexism is a form of collectivism.They welcome people of any sex or gender as part of their coalition and events.

Feminists for Liberty also opposes carceral feminism. The group argues that that government has historically been one of the biggest perpetrators of sex discrimination, gender-based oppression, and sexual violence. It aims to promote "voluntary solutions to gender inequity, and [...] the social, cultural, and economic conditions in which these solutions can flourish,"

The group aims to highlight how economic liberty is crucial for women's advancement, and how "free speech, an open internet, religious freedom, sexual privacy, self-defense, and robust due process rights are essential to an equal and just society."

Association of Libertarian Feminists (ALF) 
The Association of Libertarian Feminists was founded in 1973 by Tonie Nathan, a journalist and the first woman in history to acquire an electoral vote. It was established on Ayn Rand's birthday, in Eugene, Oregon, at Nathan's home. Tonie Nathan was a founding member and former vice president of the Libertarian Party

The co-founder of the Association of Libertarian Feminists is Sharon Presley, who is also known as a libertarian feminist, activist, author, and retired psychology lecturer. Presley was the national coordinator for the Libertarian Feminists' Association in the mid-1970s and now she is the executive director of the organization.

At a meeting held in New York City, ALF became a national organization in September 1975. In 1977, Nathan suggested eliminating entire parts of the United States Postal Regulations that obstruct the mailing of birth control samples and information about family planning at the National Women's Conference in Houston, Texas.

Purposes of ALF: 

 Encourage women to become self sufficient economically and mentally unconstrained.
 Advertise and support rational views towards women's expertise, success, and ability.
 To condemn every government's curtailment of individual rights in terms of sex. 
 Work to shift misogynistic views and actions shown by people.
 Oppose features of the feminist movement that aim to discourage freedom and autonomy and instead offer a libertarian solution.

Sharon Presley and one of the other individual feminists, Lynn Kinsky wrote a pamphlet of a libertarian feminist during the 70s era, discussing the government as women's enemy. They stated that it sounds cynical to turn their head and ask for the government's help to reach a solution for their problems because the government actually gives more damages instead of bringing any benefits.

Issues regarding the government: 

 Child Care Centers: The child-care problem was created by government legislation. State rules, needless and redundant “health and safety” regulations, registration licenses that are impossible to acquire - all combine to ensure that citizens will not come together on their own and provide low-cost child care. They have to spend a significant amount of the expense of child-care facilities for the government authorities or to pay rent on excessively costly houses. The government also wants to be in charge of the children's development like how it is done in public schools. 
 Public Schools: Public schools not only promote the worst of secularist misogynistic ideals but with bland, suppressing approaches and obligatory services and laws that instill conformity and submission to authority. They also use psychiatric tests and counseling, confidential (and sometimes viciously subjective) files that fellow children during their school years, to control over the lives of children in public schools.

Law and sociopolitical view 
The influence of individualist feminism prevailed in the United States in the 19th century. It was an idea of "absolute equality of women under just law, without gender-based privileges or sanctions." The idea of individualist feminism has its roots in the philosophy of natural law, which believes that people have complete rights to their own bodies and that without any penalty, no other people should violate or decide about it. Discrimination can be seen not only towards women in the 19th century, but also towards ethnic groups. Therefore, the most controversial area in which women felt most suppressed was legal issues. Women were restricted from occupations, they could not vote, and they lost their right to their earnings or property in marriage.

A culture that represents equal regard for the natural rights of all people, male or female, is the ultimate aim of individualist feminism. Under natural law, individualist feminism promoted the fair treatment of all human beings. As a campaign, it called for the law to be oblivious to the secondary characteristics of sex and to accommodate women at the same level as men, according to their primary characteristic of being a human.

Individualist feminism often envisages its progressive causes through discourses on human rights. Individualist feminists typically promote the defence of their individual choices and rights. For example, individualist feminists believe that abortion is a choice and right that must be covered by the law. Individualist feminism differs from relational feminism because, within established laws or structures, the latter is seen to be mostly promoting fair justice, while the former protested against existing laws and institutions.

In ifeminism, feminists opposed the punishment of speech that was meant to deter abuse and protected the freedom of expression, especially of speech that society disagreed with.

Individualist feminism advises ending the opposite of all classes under the law so that every individual can receive equal rights and equal claim to individuals and property, irrespective of things such as gender or ethnicity. The real component of government is to eliminate the advantage and secure the interests of individual men and women equally. Various philosophical approaches, such as equity feminism, strive at fairness within established institutions without actually altering the current structure to clarify people's natural rights. The benefits that women have received from certain policies, such as positive action, are undoubtedly beneficial. Individualist feminism, therefore, argues that women's benefits are excluded in order to achieve true justice.

Criticism 

Criticism of individualist feminism ranges from expressing disagreements with the values of individualism as a feminist to expressing the limitations within individualist feminism as an effective activism.

US feminist Susan Brownmiller suggests that the aversion from collective, "united" feminism is a sign of "waning" and unhealthy feminist movement, implying that the individualist feminism has caused a deficit in the true identity and impetus of feminism.

Another claim that has been made against individualist feminism is that it gives little to no attention to structural inequality. Sandra Friedan proposes that bettering one's life through personal choices could result in the lack of awareness towards structural sexism, which makes individualist feminism a feeble tool in opposing gender disparity.

Jan Clausen also expresses her worry regarding the inadequacy of individualist feminism, mainly its association with the younger generation who "have no had little or no exposure to the realities of attempting ... social change", which she finds very discomforting.

American radical feminist Catharine MacKinnon disregards the value of individual choice because there are still instances where "women are used, abused, bought, sold, and silenced", and "no woman is yet exempt from this condition from the moment of her birth to the moment of her death, in the eyes of the law, or in the memory of her children", especially among women of color.

People 

 William Lloyd Garrison – (1805–1879)
 Ezra Heywood – (1829–1893)
 Voltairine de Cleyre – (1866–1912)
 Dora Marsden – (1882–1960)
 Suzanne La Follette – (1893–1983)
 Tonie Nathan – (b. 1923)
 Joan Kennedy Taylor – (1926–2005)
 Mimi Reisel Gladstein – (b. 1936)
 Sharon Presley – (b. 1943)
 Camille Paglia – (b. 1947)
 Christina Hoff Sommers – (b. 1950)
 Wendy McElroy – (b. 1951)
 Virginia Postrel – (b. 1960)
 Cathy Young – (b. 1963)
 Tiffany Million – (b. 1966)

Topics 

 Anarcha-feminism
 Cultural liberalism / radicalism
 Equity feminism
 Female entrepreneur
 Feminist anthropology
 Feminist economics
 Feminist existentialism
 Feminist political theory and ecology
 Individualist anarchism
 Left-libertarianism
 Liberal feminism
 Libertarian perspectives on abortion
 List of conservative feminisms
 Sex-positive feminism
 Women's property rights

References

Further reading 
 
  One of the first individualist feminist essays, by Ezra Heywood.
 
 
 
  Essay including discussion of libertarian feminism.

External links 
 Association of Libertarian Feminists
 iFeminists
 Pro Choice Libertarians 
 The Mother's Institute
 Ladies of Liberty Alliance (LOLA)

 
Feminist movements and ideologies
Feminist theory
Libertarianism by form
Individualist anarchism
Feminism and history